The Queen Mary Labour Society (QMLS), formerly Queen Mary Labour Club, is a society at Queen Mary University of London for students who support the Labour Party. It is affiliated to Labour Students and the Labour Party.

History
The club was established in the late 1940s, and has previously had strong connections to the Oxford and Cambridge Labour Clubs. In recent years, it has enjoyed collaborating with the Hull University Labour Club and the LSE SU Labour Society. Over the years the society has gone through several disaffiliations as a result of committees failing to hand on the society before graduating. QMLS has been an active society in the Tower Hamlets region, with members campaigning during the general elections of 1992, helping contribute towards the +7.6% swing towards Labour and, more prominently, in 1997.

Recent
In 2004/05 the Society was reinstated by students who wanted to bring back a strong alternative voice to the East End. Supporters campaigned for the then Labour Party MP for Bethnal Green and Bow, Oona King, but King was defeated by George Galloway, the Respect candidate,  at the 2005 general election. Labour supporters at the Queen Mary University experienced a very difficult and volatile campaign during this period waged by opposition who heavily campaigned against the MP on her position on the Iraq War.

The society now also holds regular speaker events, and helps train members in campaigning. Recent speakers include the former Mayor of London, Ken Livingstone, and MPs Rushanara Ali, Peter Hain and Andy Burnham. Past speakers have included the now Baroness Oona King.

Co-Chairs

Alumni 

Peter Hain MP and Leader of the House of Commons 2003-2005
Joshua Peck, the Bow West Councillor, was President of the Queen Mary Labour Society when a student at the University.

References

External links 
QMLS at the Queen Mary Students' Union

Queen Mary University of London
Labour Students